Park Ji-soo (Hanja: 朴志洙; born 13 June 1994) is a South Korean footballer who plays as a centre-back for Portuguese club Portimonense and the South Korea national team.

Playing career
Park Ji-soo would play for top tier club Incheon United's youth setup before he was promoted to their senior team where he signed his first professional contract at the start of the 2013 league season. Throughout the season he did not make any appearances for the team and was released from the club at the end of the season. This saw Park join K3 League club FC Uijeongbu for the 2014 league season before going on a practice match for K League 2 club Gyeongnam FC where he showed potential and was signed by the team.

In January 2015, Park officially joined Gyeongnam FC and he would make his debut in a league game against Ansan Police on 22 March 2015 in a 0–0 draw. This would be followed by his debut goal for the club in a league match against Chungju Hummel on 5 July 2015 in a 1–1 draw. Park would establish himself as an integral part of the team's defence and go on to aid the club to win the 2017 K League 2 division and promotion to the top tier. Park and Gyeongnam FC would continue their upward trajectory and the club surprisingly came runners-up in the 2018 K League 1 campaign.

On 20 February 2019, Park transferred to Chinese Super League side Guangzhou Evergrande. On 5 March 2019, he made his debut for the club in a 2–0 home win over Japanese side Sanfrecce Hiroshima in the 2019 AFC Champions League. He would go on to establish himself as a regular within the team and go on to win the 2019 Chinese Super League title with the club.

On 25 January 2023, Park signed for Portuguese club Portimonense on a one-and-a-half-year contract.

Career statistics

Club

International

Honours 
Gyeongnam FC
K League 2: 2017

Guangzhou Evergrande
Chinese Super League: 2019

Gimcheon Sangmu
K League 2: 2021

South Korea
EAFF Championship: 2019

Individual
K League 2 Best XI: 2017
AFC Champions League All-Star Squad: 2019
AFC Champions League Opta Best XI: 2019

Notes

References

External links 

1994 births
Living people
People from Mungyeong
Association football defenders
South Korean footballers
South Korea international footballers
Incheon United FC players
Gyeongnam FC players
Guangzhou F.C. players
Portimonense S.C. players
Chinese Super League players
Primeira Liga players
K League 2 players
K League 1 players
K3 League players
South Korean expatriate sportspeople in China
South Korean expatriate sportspeople in Portugal
South Korean expatriate footballers
Expatriate footballers in China
Expatriate footballers in Portugal
Footballers at the 2020 Summer Olympics
Olympic footballers of South Korea
Sportspeople from North Gyeongsang Province